Potamonautes loveridgei is a species of crustacean in the family Potamonautidae. It is found in the rivers that flow into Lake Tanganyika.

References

Potamoidea
Freshwater crustaceans of Africa
Crustaceans described in 1933
Taxa named by Mary J. Rathbun
Taxonomy articles created by Polbot